Vinec is a municipality and village in Mladá Boleslav District in the Central Bohemian Region of the Czech Republic. It has about 300 inhabitants.

Geography
It lies in an agricultural landscape in the Jizera Table. The municipality is situated on the right bank of the Jizera River.

History

The first written mention of Vinec is from 1352, but the site was probably inhabited as early as 1165, as this date is found on the local church. In the 14th century, the village was owned by Markvart of Zvířetice, then it was sold to lords of Michalovice. The Vančura of Řehnice family acquired Vinec in the 15th century. In the first half of the 17th century, the Waldstein family bought the village and joined it to the Dobrovice estate.

Sights
The Church of Saint Nicholas is one of the most important historic buildings in the region, protected as a national cultural monument. This Romanesque church was probably built in 1240, but its core dates from the 12th century. Several reconstructions and modifications were made, but in 1886 the church was cleaned of these reconstructions and its purely Romanesque character was restored.

References

External links

Villages in Mladá Boleslav District